Dawakin Tofa Science College is a government-run secondary school in Kano, Nigeria, in order to train students in science and to provide the state with well-qualified doctors and engineers. As of 2015 it is rated to be the best government-owned secondary school in the state of Kano.

References 

Secondary schools in Nigeria
Special schools in Nigeria
Universities and colleges in Nigeria
Government schools in Nigeria